Strange Cargo is the second album by electronic instrumentalist William Orbit. It is the first in a series of similarly titled albums: Strange Cargo II, Strange Cargo III, and Strange Cargo Hinterland. In its original release it was accompanied by a short liner note by Miles Copeland.

Track listing
 "Via Caliente"  – 2:35
 "Fire and Mercy"  – 5:10
 "Jump Jet"  – 2:08
 "Silent Signals"  – 5:56
 "The Secret Garden"  – 3:36
 "Out of the Ice"  – 3:20
 "Scorpion"  – 2:05
 "Riding to Rio"  – 3:02
 "Jimmy's Jag"  – 3:26
 "The Mighty Limpopo"  – 4:18
 "Theme Dream"  – 2:03

1987 albums
William Orbit albums
Albums produced by William Orbit
I.R.S. Records albums